This is not a complete listing of everything listed and traded on the TSX.
 Only one share class per issuer is listed (so the banks with many preferred shares are only listed once). The symbol listed is the company's primary symbol.
 No ETFs
 No structured financial/investment companies (e.g. Aberdeen Asia-Pacific Income Investment Company Limited)

A

See also
Toronto Stock Exchange
List of Canadian companies
S&P/TSX Composite Index

References

External links
 Toronto Stock Exchange

A